DiMichele (or Di Michele in its original form) is a patronymic surname of Italian origin meaning "of Michele" (equivalent of Michael). People with the surname include:

People
Adam DiMichele (b. 1985), U.S. former football player
Alicia DiMichele (b. 1973), former star of U.S. reality show Mob Wives
David Di Michele (b. 1976), Italian football player
Frank DiMichele (b. 1965), U.S. former baseball player

See also
 De Michele
 Michaelson

Italian-language surnames
Patronymic surnames
Surnames from given names